Ali İsmail Sabancı (May 5, 1969; Adana) is a Turkish businessperson and a third generation member of the Sabancı Family. He is the Chairperson of Esas Holding.

Education life 

Ali Sabancı earned his M.B.A. degree with a major in International Finance from Columbia Business School and B.A. degree in Politics and Economics from Tufts University.

Career

Ali Sabancı is the Chairperson of Esas Holding and Pegasus Airlines, vice chairperson of Mars Athletic and a board member of Ayakkabı Dünyası, which are part of the Esas Private Equity portfolio. He also serves on the board of Esas Properties.

Ali is one of the co-founders of Esas Social, which was established to facilitate sustainable social investment. He focuses on increasing awareness of entrepreneurship in Turkey. As the president of the Young Entrepreneurs Board in the Union of Chambers and Commodity Exchanges of Turkey (TOBB), he has led successful projects including Angel Investing Legislation, Global Entrepreneurship Congress, G3 Forum, Global Entrepreneurship Week and TIM Innovation Week - Born Global. He is also an angel investor in more than 25 start-up companies.

Ali is a member of the Turkish American Business Association and the Turkish Family Business Association. He is a member of Board of Trustees of Entrepreneurship Foundation and a founding member of GEN (Global Entrepreneurship Network ) Türkiye. 

In 2018 he was awarded the Légion d'Honneur by the French government for his contributions to economic relations between Turkey and France.

Life 
Ali Sabancı is married to Vuslat Doğan Sabancı and has two sons, Emrecan Şevket Sabancı and Kaan Ali Sabancı.

See also
 Pegasus Airlines

References

External links
 Biography

1969 births
Living people
Businesspeople from Adana
Ali Sabanci
Tufts University School of Arts and Sciences alumni
Columbia Business School alumni
Recipients of the Legion of Honour